From the Muddy Banks of the Wishkah is a live album by American rock band Nirvana, released on October 1, 1996. It features live performances recorded between 1989 and 1994.

The album debuted at number one on the Billboard 200, selling nearly 159,000 copies in its first week of release. It spent 25 weeks on the chart and became the band's sixth platinum album in the US since 1991. It was ranked at number nine in Rolling Stones 1997 critics' poll of the top 10 albums of 1996.

Background

From the Muddy Banks of the Wishkah was the second Nirvana album released following the death of vocalist and guitarist Kurt Cobain in April 1994. It was compiled primarily by bassist Krist Novoselic, who also wrote the album's liner notes. Novoselic and drummer Dave Grohl had originally intended to release a live album in 1994 to accompany what became MTV Unplugged in New York in a two-disc set originally titled Verse Chorus Verse (which had also been a working title for the band's final studio album, In Utero, as well as the title of two Nirvana songs). However, Novoselic and Grohl reportedly had a difficult time working on the album so soon after Cobain's death, and the album was compiled, but never mixed. The original track list featured several songs not present on From the Muddy Banks of the Wishkah—"Serve the Servants", "Dive", "Rape Me", "Sappy" and "Territorial Pissings"—and different versions of the overlapping songs, other than "Negative Creep" and "Scentless Apprentice".

The album's title refers to the Wishkah River in Aberdeen, Washington, where Cobain claimed to have spent nights sleeping under the Young Street Bridge as a teenager (as referenced in the song "Something in the Way", from Nevermind). This claim has since been refuted by Novoselic, who said, "He never lived under that bridge. He hung out there, but you couldn't live on those muddy banks, with the tide coming up and down. That was his own revisionism."

Release

From the Muddy Banks of the Wishkah avoids all songs that appear on MTV Unplugged, with the exception of "Polly", using a heavier, electric version of the song from 1989, as it was originally performed live. It also avoids using any versions of songs previously released as B-sides, or on the home video Live! Tonight! Sold Out!!, which had been compiled by Cobain, and was released in unfinished form in November 1994.

The album features three songs from the band's show at the London Astoria on December 3, 1989, which was highly praised by the British music press at the time, with NME stating that "Nirvana are Sub Pop's answer to The Beatles". The version of "Breed" which is included from this show was then under the working title of "Imodium", and features different lyrics, and different drums by Chad Channing, to version that was eventually released on the Nevermind album which features Dave Grohl on drums. 

Only one song on the album, "Negative Creep" is from the band's October 1991 show at the Paramount Theatre in Seattle. English music journalist Everett True, of Melody Maker magazine, who was also a friend of Cobain's, described the Paramount show as "the end of an era" that showed that "incontrovertibly, Nirvana was now big news". The full show was later released as Live at the Paramount on DVD in 2011, and on vinyl in 2019. Nirvana were scheduled to play a show at the Melkweg in Amsterdam on November 24, 1991, but due to popular demand the show had to be rescheduled to a larger venue at the Paradiso, Amsterdam which took place the next day and four of the songs on the album were taken from this show. In December, 1991, Nirvana embarked on a mini US tour with the Red Hot Chili Peppers and Pearl Jam, with three songs on the album coming from a show on this tour at Del Mar Fairgrounds in Del Mar, California, on December 28, 1991. Only one song on the album, "Tourette's", is taken from the band's 1992 headline appearance at the Reading Festival in England which Cobain introduced to the crowd as being called "The Eagle Has Landed". The full show was later released as Live at Reading in 2009. 

One song on the album, "Scentless Apprentice", is included from the band's December 13, 1993 MTV show at Seattle's Pier 48 where they were supported by hip-hop act Cypress Hill and alternative band The Breeders. The full show was later released as Live and Loud on DVD in 2013, and on vinyl in 2019. One song each is taken from three other separate shows of the band's 1993-94 In Utero tour: "Sliver" is taken from the Springfield Civic Center, Springfield on November 10, 1993. "Heart-Shaped Box" is taken from a show at the 18,759 capacity Great Western Forum in Los Angeles, on December 30, 1993. At that show Cobain also dedicated a song to the recently deceased River Phoenix. "Milk It" is from the Seattle Center Arena, January 7, 1994.

No commercial singles were released from the album, but promotional singles were sent out for radio play for a number of the songs, including "Aneurysm" (US and UK), "Drain You" (US), "Lithium" (Portugal and the Netherlands), and "Smells Like Teen Spirit" (France, Portugal and Spain). A limited edition promotional box set was also released in Australia containing three promotional singles for the songs "Aneurysm", "Heart-Shaped Box", and "Polly". The box set also included Nevermind It's an Interview, a promotional interview disc released in 1992.

Side 4 of the vinyl release features additional stage banter from various shows, as well as a brief clip of the band performing "Dumb" before stopping it after Cobain accidentally repeats the second verse instead of playing the bridge.

Reception

From the Muddy Banks of the Wishkah became Nirvana's third consecutive album to debut at number one on the Billboard 200, and fourth to top the chart overall.

Lorraine Ali of Rolling Stone described it as the "emotional, visceral flip side" of MTV Unplugged in New York, and as "riotous and liberating", showing the band "in their most natural state, smashing instruments and inducing irreversible tinnitus." Stephen Thomas Erlewine of AllMusic called it "a little scattershot" but "still a terrific record" which "finds a great band in top form." American music critic Robert Christgau wrote, "I play Unplugged to refresh my memory of a sojourner's spirituality. I'll play this one when I want to remember a band's guts, fury, and rock and roll music"; Tim Peacock of uDiscover called the album "the formidable yang to the subtle, acoustic yin of MTV Unplugged," and praised the selections from the band's "scintillating" November 1991 show at the Paradiso in Amsterdam, Netherlands and "transcendent" December 1991 show at  Del Mar Fairgrounds in Del Mar, California, in particular.

The album was ranked at number nine in Rolling Stones 1997 critics' poll of the top 10 albums of 1996, and number 14 in Spins "20 Best Albums of 1996" list.

Keith Cameron welcomed the compilation's emphasis on the "positive...versions of 'Polly' and 'Breed' from the Lamefest gig at London's Astoria in December 1989, [the night] Nirvana opened for Mudhoney and Tad at a two-thirds empty theatre, [and] served notice that they were the band destined to redirect the gaze of the pop world onto a town called Seattle."

Radio & Records described the 1996 documentary Teen Spirit: The Tribute to Kurt Cobain as the "video scrapbook companion to Nirvana's From the Muddy Banks of the Wishkah LP".

Track listing

The four Amsterdam songs and three California songs above were later released as part of the 30th Anniversary edition of Nevermind.

Personnel

Nirvana
Kurt Cobain – vocals, guitar
Krist Novoselic – bass guitar
Dave Grohl – drums (except on "Polly" and "Breed"), background vocals on "Drain You", "Aneurysm", "Been a Son", "Sliver" and "Heart-Shaped Box" 
Chad Channing – drums on "Polly" and "Breed"
Pat Smear – rhythm guitar on "Sliver", "Scentless Apprentice", "Heart-Shaped Box" and "Milk It", background vocals on "Sliver" and "Heart-Shaped Box"

Production

Scott Litt, Craig Montgomery, Craig Overbay – engineering
Bob Ludwig – mastering
Shauna O'Brien, Diane Stata – production, production coordination
Andy Wallace – engineering, mixing on tracks 3, 4, 5, 10, 12, and 13
Krist Novoselic – liner notes
Robert Fisher – design
Lisa Johnson, Kevin Mazur, Charles Peterson – photography
Mark Kates – photography

Charts

Weekly charts

Year-end charts

Certifications

References

External links

From the Muddy Banks of the Wishkah at YouTube (streamed copy where licensed)

Live albums published posthumously
Nirvana (band) live albums
1996 live albums
1996 compilation albums
Nirvana (band) compilation albums
Geffen Records compilation albums
Geffen Records live albums
DGC Records live albums